Dwellers in the Mirage is a fantasy novel by American writer A. Merritt.  It was first published in book form in 1932 by Horace Liveright.  The novel was originally serialized in six parts in the magazine Argosy beginning with the January 23, 1932 issue.

Plot introduction
The novel concerns American Leif Langdon who discovers a warm valley in Alaska.  Two races inhabit the valley, the Little People and a branch of an ancient Mongolian race; they worship the evil Kraken named Khalk'ru which they summon from another dimension to offer human sacrifice.  The inhabitants recognize Langdon as the reincarnation of their long dead hero, Dwayanu.  Dwayanu's spirit possesses Langdon and starts a war with the Little People.  Langdon eventually fights off the presence of Dwayanu and destroys the Kraken.

There are variant endings of the work. In the original, Leif's love dies, but the publisher inartistically has her survive. The original tragic ending has been reinstated in some recent reprints.

Reception
Anthony Boucher and J. Francis McComas described Dwellers in the Mirage as attractive to "those who love wild adventure even when shallowly written."

References

Sources

External links
 Dwellers in the Mirage at the Australian Project Gutenberg site.
 

1932 American novels
1932 fantasy novels
American fantasy novels
Novels first published in serial form
Science fantasy novels
Works originally published in Argosy (magazine)
Novels set in Alaska
Lost world novels